Lee Brydon (born 15 November 1974) is an English former professional footballer who played as a defender for Darlington in the Football League.

References

1974 births
Living people
Footballers from Stockton-on-Tees
English footballers
Association football defenders
Liverpool F.C. players
Darlington F.C. players
Bishop Auckland F.C. players
Barrow A.F.C. players
English Football League players